Juan Pablo Santiagos (born 6 November 1968) is a Chilean alpine skier. He competed in four events at the 1988 Winter Olympics.

References

1968 births
Living people
Chilean male alpine skiers
Olympic alpine skiers of Chile
Alpine skiers at the 1988 Winter Olympics
Place of birth missing (living people)
20th-century Chilean people